The Supercopa de España de Voleibol Femenino ( in English) is an annual Spanish women's volleyball tournament played by the Superliga Femenina champions and Copa de la Reina winners. It is organized and administrated by the Real Federación Española de Voleibol (Spanish Volleyball Royal Federation).

The tournament was established in 1990 but it was contested from 1991 to 2001. It usually takes place in October.

Results

Source: Real Federación Española de Voleibol (REFEVB)
* Note: Unofficial title, as the match played in 1992 is not recognized by the REFEVB.

Titles by club

Individual awards
The following players received the most valuable player award.
 2005 – 
 2006 – 
 2007 – 
 2008 – 
 2009 – 
 2010 – not awarded
 2012 – 
 2013 – 
 2014 – 
 2015 – 
 2016 – 
 2020 – 
 2021 – 
 2022 –

References

External links
RFEVB Official website
Supercopa winners list

Women's volleyball competitions in Spain